Ashill may refer to:

Ashill, Cornwall
Ashill, Devon
Ashill, Norfolk
Ashill, Somerset